General elections were held in the Cayman Islands on 20 November 1996. The result was a victory for the ruling National Team, which won 9 of the 15 seats in the Legislative Assembly.

Results

References

1996
1996 elections in the Caribbean
1996 in the Cayman Islands
1996 elections in British Overseas Territories
November 1996 events in North America